Anita Vogel (born November 24,  New York City ) is an American news reporter for the Fox News Channel.

Life and career
Anita Vogel was born on 24 Novemberto an Armenian American mother, and father of Eastern European descent who died during Vogel's infancy. Her mother's family escaped the Armenian genocide from the small village of Evereg, which was part of what is now Develi, a town and district in Kayseri Province in Central Anatolia Region,  Turkey.  Her mother was born in New York and moved the family from New York to California when Vogel was 2 years old.

Vogel graduated with a B.A. in broadcast journalism and political science from the University of Southern California. In 1992, she accepted a position as a desk assistant at ABC News in Washington.

Vogel worked for WJET in Erie, Pennsylvania, WTLV- 12 in Jacksonville Floria and KCRA in Sacramento. She began her career in Washington, D.C., working for ABC Network News. She joined the Los Angeles Bureau of the Fox News Channel in 2001 and has been with the network ever since. Beginning in 2021 Vogel began working out of Fox New York and Washington DC bureaus where she frequently fills in as a host on various shows.

References 

1969 births
American television reporters and correspondents
American people of Armenian descent
Living people
Fox News people
University of Southern California alumni